The Queen of Navarre (Italian: La regina di Navarra) is a 1942 Italian "white-telephones" historical film directed by Carmine Gallone and starring Elsa Merlini, Gino Cervi and Renato Cialente. It was made at the Cinecittà Studios in Rome, based on a play by Eugène Scribe. The film portrays a series of intrigues at the Madrid court of Charles V in the Sixteenth century.

Cast
 Elsa Merlini as Margherita di Valois
 Gino Cervi as Carlo Vº
 Renato Cialente as Francesco Iº
 Leonardo Cortese as Enrico D'albret
 Clara Calamai as Isabella del Portogallo
 Paolo Stoppa as Il corriere Babieca  
 Valentina Cortese as Eleonora d'Austria
 Nerio Bernardi as Il marchese di Gattinara  
 Greta Gonda as Conchita Babieca  
 Margherita Bagni as La duchessa di Ossuna 
 Wanda Capodaglio as Una dama di corte 
 Oreste Fares as Il sacerdote 
 Enzo Musumeci Greco as Il maestro di scherma 
 Adriano Vitale as Un messagero

References

Bibliography 
 Nowell-Smith, Geoffrey & Hay, James & Volpi, Gianni. The Companion to Italian Cinema. Cassell, 1996.

External links 
 

1942 films
Italian historical drama films
1940s historical drama films
1940s Italian-language films
Films directed by Carmine Gallone
Italian films based on plays
Films based on works by Eugène Scribe
Films set in Madrid
Films set in the 1520s
Italian black-and-white films
Films shot at Cinecittà Studios
1940s Italian films